Cirsonella laxa is a minute sea snail, a marine gastropod mollusc in the family Skeneidae.

Description
The height of the shell attains 0.6 mm, its diameter 0.9 mm.

Distribution
This species is endemic to New Zealand and occurs off Three Kings Islands at a depth of 250 m.

References

 Powell A. W. B., New Zealand Mollusca, William Collins Publishers Ltd, Auckland, New Zealand 1979 

variecostata
Gastropods of New Zealand
Gastropods described in 1940